Svetlana Kuznetsova defeated Agnieszka Radwańska 6–4, 6–7(7–9), 6–3 in the final.

Seeds
The top two seeds receive a bye into the second round.

Main draw

Finals

Top half

Bottom half

Qualifying

Seeds

Qualifiers

Lucky loser
  Jamie Hampton

Qualifying draw

First qualifier

Second qualifier

Third qualifier

Fourth qualifier

External links
 Main and qualifying draws
 ITF tournament profile

Southern California Open
Mercury Insurance Open - Singles